William VII may refer to:

 William VII, Duke of Aquitaine (1023–1058)
 William VII the Young of Auvergne (ruled 1145–1168)
 William VII of Montpellier (c. 1131–c. 1172)
 William VII of Angoulême (died 1186)
 William VII, Marquis of Montferrat (c. 1240–1292)
 William VII of Jülich, 1st Duke of Berg (c. 1348-1408)
 William VII of Chalon-Arlay (c. 1415–1475)
 William VII, Landgrave of Hesse-Kassel (1651–1670)